William Brian de Lacy Aherne (2 May 190210 February 1986) was an English actor of stage, screen, radio and television, who enjoyed a long and varied career in Britain and the United States.

His first Broadway appearance in The Barretts of Wimpole Street in 1931 teamed him with Katharine Cornell, with whom he appeared in many productions. In films, he played opposite Madeleine Carroll, Bette Davis, Marlene Dietrich, Rita Hayworth and Carole Lombard, and was Oscar-nominated for his role as Emperor Maximilian in Juarez (1939). On TV, he appeared in The Twilight Zone episode, "The Trouble With Templeton", Wagon Train and Rawhide.

Early life and career

Early life
He was born in King's Norton, Worcestershire, the second and younger son of the architect William de Lacy Aherne and his wife Louise (née Thomas). His elder brother Pat Aherne was also an actor.

Educated in Edgbaston, Birmingham, he received stage training at Italia Conti Academy in London as a child actor and then completed his education at Malvern College.

English stage
He first appeared on the stage in Birmingham with the Pilgrim Players (which developed into the Birmingham Repertory Theatre) on 5 April 1910 in Fifinella, and he made his first appearance on the London stage at the Garrick Theatre, 26 December 1913 in Where the Rainbow Ends, a play by Clifford Mills and John Ramsey, with music by Roger Quilter, which ran at various theatres for over 25 years.

He then studied with a view to becoming an architect, but, having had considerable amateur experience in Birmingham and with Liverpool's Green Room Club, he obtained an engagement under Robert Courtneidge, and appeared at London's Savoy Theatre, opening on 26 December 1923, as Jack O'Hara in a revival of Paddy the Next Best Thing, the play by W. Gayer-Mackay and Robert Ord (from the novel).

He then toured with Violet Vanbrugh as Hugo in The Flame and appeared at the London Playhouse in May 1924 as Langford in Leon Gordon's White Cargo, in which he played all through 1924–1925.

English films
Aherne's first screen appearance was in The Eleventh Commandment in 1924. He made several appearances in productions at Cricklewood Studios by Stoll Pictures, then the largest British film company, including two directed by Sinclair Hill: The Squire of Long Hadley (1925) and A Woman Redeemed (1927). He was also in King of the Castle (1925) and the comedy Safety First (1926).

In 1926. he accompanied Dion Boucicault Jr. to Australia, where he appeared in several plays by J.M. Barrie (as Valentine Brown in the comedy Quality Street, John Shand in the comedy What Every Woman Knows, Crichton in The Admirable Crichton, Simon and Harry in Mary Rose) and Willocks in Aren't We All?, another comedy by Frederick Lonsdale.

Aherne reappeared in London at the Strand in March 1927, again as Langford, in White Cargo and continued on the London stage in a succession of plays until late 1930 when he went to the U.S.

His latter silents were two films Shooting Stars and Underground by director Anthony Asquith. Aherne made his sound debut in The W Plan (1930), directed by Victor Saville. He appeared opposite Madeleine Carroll in Madame Guillotine (1931).

U.S. career

Broadway
Aherne made his first appearance on the New York City stage at the Empire Theatre on 9 February 1931, playing Robert Browning in Rudolf Besier's play The Barretts of Wimpole Street opposite Katharine Cornell. The play was a big success, running for 370 performances. Cornell and Aherne remained lifelong friends and he played in many of her productions.

Aherne returned to Broadway in 1932 for Lucrece, which starred Cornell. It only had a short run. He then went to Hollywood, where he made his American film debut in The Song of Songs (1933) with Marlene Dietrich.

He returned to England, where he starred in the film of Basil Dean's The Constant Nymph (1933).

In 1934, he was reunited with Cornell on Broadway in Romeo and Juliet, playing Mercutio; Cornell was Juliet, and Basil Rathbone was Romeo. It only ran 77 performances.

Hollywood
In Hollywood, Aherne supported Ann Harding in The Fountain (1934), released by RKO Pictures.  At Metro-Goldwyn-Mayer, Aherne co-starred with Helen Hayes in What Every Woman Knows (1934), and Joan Crawford in I Live My Life (1935), which was a big hit. In 1935, Aherne and Cornell revived The Barretts of Wimpole Street on Broadway for 24 performances.  Aherne returned to RKO for Sylvia Scarlett (1935) with Katharine Hepburn and Cary Grant, a notorious flop. 

He returned to Broadway, where he appeared in Cornell's production of Saint Joan (1936), co-starring Maurice Evans. Back in Hollywood, he appeared in Beloved Enemy (1936) with Merle Oberon at Goldwyn Productions.  Then, in 1937, he appeared as Iago on Broadway in Othello.

At Warner Bros., Aherne was top-billed in The Great Garrick (1937), directed by James Whale. He supported Constance Bennett in the hit comedy Merrily We Live (1938) for Hal Roach Studios, distributed by MGM. He was Oscar-nominated for his role as Emperor Maxmilian in Juarez (1939).

Hal Roach gave Aherne the star role in Captain Fury (1939) as a bushranger in colonial Australia. He supported Carole Lombard in Vigil in the Night (1940) at RKO, then reunited with Madeleine Carroll in My Son, My Son! (1940) for Edward Small.

Columbia
Aherne was billed over Rita Hayworth in The Lady in Question (1940) at Columbia. He made Hired Wife (1940) at Universal with Rosalind Russell; for that studio, he did The Man Who Lost Himself (1941) with Kay Francis.

MGM put Aherne in support of Jeanette MacDonald for Smilin' Through (1941). He supported Claudette Colbert in Skylark (1941) at Paramount and Rosalind Russell in My Sister Eileen (1942) at Columbia. He stayed at that studio to support Loretta Young in A Night to Remember (1942) and was one of many stars in Forever and a Day (1943).

At Columbia, Aherne supported Merle Oberon in First Comes Courage (1943) and Rosalind Russell in The Beautiful Cheat (1943).

In 1943, he quit films to become a flight instructor for the Royal Air Force at Falcon Field, Arizona. In November 1943, it was reported Columbia paid him $144,958 for the year, making him the second highest paid person at Columbia after Harry Cohn.

He fell ill with influenza while touring army camps in 1944.

Postwar
In 1945, he and Cornell returned to Broadway in a revival of The Barretts of Wimpole Street. He stayed in New York to appear in The French Touch (1945–1946), directed by René Clair.

Aherne returned to movies with RKO's The Locket (1946), billed after Laraine Day. He was top-billed in Smart Woman (1948), co-starring producer Constance Bennett. He did Drums Along the Amazon (1948) for Republic.

Aherne was in a Broadway revival of She Stoops to Conquer (1949–1950).

Television
Aherne made his television debut with "Dear Brutus" for The Ford Theatre Hour (1950), which he had performed on stage in Boston. He followed it with "The Magnificent Gesture" for Armstrong Circle Theatre (1950), "A Well-Remembered Voice" for Lux Video Theatre, "The Old Flame" for The Billy Rose Show (1951), "The Buccaneer" for Pulitzer Prize Playhouse (1951), and Betty Crocker Star Matinee (1952).

He and Cornell reunited on stage in The Constant Wife (1951–1952). Then Aherne returned to Hollywood. He had supporting roles in I Confess (1953), directed by Alfred Hitchcock, and Titanic (1953) as Captain E.J. Smith.

Aherne did Escapade (1953) on Broadway and "Two for Tea" for Lux Video Theatre and "Element of Risk" and "Breakdown" for Robert Montgomery Presents (1953).

20th Century Fox asked Aherne back to Hollywood to play King Arthur in Prince Valiant (1954) and to play a supporting part in A Bullet Is Waiting (1954).

He did Quadrille (1954–1955) on Broadway with the Lunts, then "Now in Rehearsal" for the Eddie Cantor episode of The Colgate Comedy Hour (1955). Aherne did "The Martyr" for General Electric Theater (1955), "Reunion in Vienna" for Producers' Showcase (1955), and "The Round Dozen" and "Appearances and Reality" for The Star and the Story (1955).

Aherne went to MGM for The Swan (1956). On TV, he did "One Minute from Broadway" for Sneak Preview (1956), "Night Shriek" for Climax! (1956), "The Sacred Trust" and "The Lamp of Father Cataldo" for Crossroads (1956), "The Transfer" for The Errol Flynn Theatre (1956), "Safe Enough" for Studio 57 (1957), and "Story Without a Moral" for Goodyear Theatre (1959).

In 1957, he went on a national tour of My Fair Lady, playing Professor Henry Higgins. In 1960, he played the title role of The Trouble with Templeton on the television series The Twilight Zone. 

Aherne was invited back to 20th Century Fox for a sizable supporting role in the big budget The Best of Everything (1959). Aherne's final Broadway appearance was in Dear Liar (1960) with Cornell, where he played George Bernard Shaw ("with great vivacity" according to The New York Times) opposite Cornell's Mrs Patrick Campbell. He acted in the movie Susan Slade (1961). He did "The Bruce Saybrook Story" on Wagon Train (1961), and "The Gentleman's Gentleman" on Rawhide (1961). He also appeared as guest host on the TV panel show The Name's the Same.

Final years
Aherne's final film roles included Lancelot and Guinevere (1963) as King Arthur, The Waltz King (1964) for Disney (as Johann Strauss I), and The Cavern (1964).

He settled in Switzerland. He appeared in a play in England and agreed to return to Hollywood to play Rosalind Russell's love interest in Rosie! (1967).

In 1970, he appeared as a mystery guest on What's My Line?.

Radio career
Aherne co-starred in the "Florence Nightingale" episode of Theatre Guild on the Air 13 April 1952. In 1945, he played sleuth Simon Templar in the mystery series The Saint. He also appeared in an episode of The Burns and Allen Show titled "Brian Aherne's Shorts" on March 28, 1944.

Personal life and death
Between 1939 and 1945, Aherne was married to actress Joan Fontaine; the marriage ended in divorce. He married Eleanor de Liagre Labrot in 1946, and their union lasted until his death in 1986.

Aherne published his autobiography A Proper Job in 1969 as well as A Dreadful Man (1979), a biography of his close friend George Sanders.

Aherne was a pilot and charter member of the Aircraft Owners and Pilots Association.

Aherne died of heart failure in Venice, Florida at the age of 83 on 10 February 1986. He was cremated at Sarasota Crematory.

Recognition
He was honored with a star on the Hollywood Walk of Fame at 1772 Vine Street.

Filmography

Awards and nominations

Footnotes

References
Parker, John, editor, Who's Who in the Theatre, 10th edition revised, London, 1947, p. 200-1.

External links

 Brian Aherne at the British Film Institute
Brian Aherne as Julian Gordon in Shooting Stars (video clip, appearance at 2:55m) at British-Pathé

1902 births
1986 deaths
20th-century English male actors
20th-century Royal Air Force personnel
English male film actors
English male silent film actors
English male stage actors
English male television actors
Alumni of the Italia Conti Academy of Theatre Arts
English expatriates in the United States
British expatriate male actors in the United States
Male actors from Birmingham, West Midlands
People educated at Malvern College
People from Kings Norton
Military personnel from Worcestershire